Tauck is an operator of guided tours and cruises. The company is owned and operated by the Tauck family and is based in Wilton, Connecticut.  Tauck offers more than 150 guided land journeys, small-ship ocean cruises, European river cruises, safaris and family travel experiences to more than 70 countries and all seven continents, and it has received numerous accolades.

History
Tauck was founded in 1925 by Arthur Tauck, Sr., then a young traveling salesman, when he brought six paying guests along on one of his sales trips through New England and southeastern Canada.  The all-inclusive, six-day trip covered 1,100 miles and cost each guest $69.  The group traveled in the mornings and guests relaxed in the afternoons while Tauck made sales calls to local clients.

At first Tauck planned no additional tours, but when word-of-mouth recommendations from his six passengers resulted in numerous inquiries about additional trips, he reconsidered.  Tauck soon launched Tauck Tours and began promoting his guided journeys in earnest.

In 1935, it became the first tour operator to be awarded a federal Tour Broker's License by the U.S. government.

In 1958, Arthur Tauck, Sr. was succeeded by his son, Arthur Tauck, Jr., who expanded the company by adding additional domestic and later international destinations to its portfolio. The younger Tauck is widely regarded as a travel industry innovator, and he is credited with a number of “firsts” including combining motorcoach tours with air travel in the 1950s, offering the first international charter air tour packages in Nova Scotia, bringing many of the first East Coast travelers to the U.S. National Parks of the American West, and introducing “heli hiking” in the Canadian Rockies.

Today

Today Tauck offers over 150 different all-inclusive, guided journeys to more than 70 countries and all seven continents.  Travel categories offered by Tauck include land journeys, European river cruises, small ship ocean cruises, Tauck Bridges family travel adventures and special Tauck events.

The Tauck company is still a family-owned and -operated enterprise. Arthur Tauck, Jr. serves as chairman. Four of Arthur Tauck's five children have either worked for or are currently involved in the business, and his son-in-law Dan Mahar is Tauck's current CEO and a board director.

Tauck is a member of the United States Tour Operators Association, and the National Tour Association, which was founded by Arthur Tauck, Jr. in 1954 as the United States Tour Brokers Association.

European River Cruising

European river cruising has been an area of particular focus for Tauck in recent years, and the company operates a fleet of nine riverboats on the Danube, Rhine, Rhône, Seine, Moselle, Saône and Douro Rivers. Tauck’s newest riverboat, the ms Andorinha, sails on the Douro River in Portugal and was launched there in August, 2021.

Ken Burns Partnership

In September 2010, Tauck announced a partnership with the documentary filmmaker Ken Burns and his longtime collaborator Dayton Duncan to tailor land journeys and special events to topics covered in Burns’ films, including the Civil War, America's national parks, jazz and baseball.

The partnership has three components:
 Tours designed by Tauck, Burns and Duncan, including itineraries exploring New England, New York's Hudson Valley, Yosemite National Park, Yellowstone National Park in wintertime, and the parks of the U.S. Southwest.
 Themed events in which Burn himself delivers a keynote address. Subjects have included the history of New York City, the cultural roots of Chicago, jazz in New Orleans, and baseball in Cooperstown, NY.
 Original short films produced by Burns and Duncan that provide their perspectives on people and places featured in their documentaries, while travelers are visiting the areas under discussion.

Recent Awards 

 In 2021, the readers of Travel + Leisure named Tauck to the magazine’s lists of the World’s Best Tour Operators, and the World’s Best River Cruise Lines. It was the only company featured on both lists. 

 Also in 2021, Conde Nast Traveller magazine included Tauck on their Readers’ Choice Awards lists of the world’s best tour operators and river cruise lines. As with the Travel + Leisure awards, Tauck was the only company included on both lists.

 In 2020, Tauck was named Best Tour Operator: Domestic Escorted and Best Tour Operator: International in Travel Weekly magazine’s annual Readers Choice Awards. That same year, Travel Pulse honored Tauck with its silver-level award for its Tauck Bridges family trips in the Best Escorted Tour Operator, Family category.

 In 2019, Luxury Travel Advisor magazine named Tauck the Best Luxury Escorted Tour Operator, while AFAR magazine’s Travelers’ Choice Awards honored Tauck in its Cultural Trips category.

References

External links 

 

1925 establishments in Connecticut
Companies based in Fairfield County, Connecticut
River cruise companies
Transport companies established in 1925
Travel and holiday companies of the United States
Wilton, Connecticut